Pachylocerus crassicornis is a species of long-horned beetle found in Peninsular India known from Chota Nagpur south to Kerala.

References

Cerambycinae